The surname Brashear is the anglicisation of the French surname Brasseur, meaning ″brewer″, or Brasier, Brazier, or Brassier. 

Brashear is a surname. Notable people with the surname include:

Carl Brashear (1931–2006), the first African-American to become a US Navy diver
Donald Brashear (born 1972), American ice hockey player
John Brashear (1840–1920), American astronomer
Kermit Brashear (born 1944), American Nebraska state senator and lawyer
Oscar Brashear (born 1944), American jazz trumpeter
Everett Brashear (1927–2020), American Professional Motorcyclist. Winner of 15 AMA nationals on Harley-Davidson and BSA flat-trackers. Also served in the US Navy as a Minesweeper during World War II

Fictional characters:
Adam Brashear (Blue Marvel (Marvel Comics)), a comic book superhero